The Proud Princess is a 1952 Czech fairytale  film directed by Bořivoj Zeman.

Cast 
 Alena Vránová - Princess Krasomila 
 Vladimír Ráž - King Miroslav
 Stanislav Neumann - Old King
  - Krasomila's Nanny
  - Jakub, Minister 
 Miloš Kopecký - Chancellor
 Oldřich Dědek - Master of Ceremonies
 Karel Effa - Guard of King's Treasure
  - Vítek
 Josef Hlinomaz - Tax Collector

References

External links 

1952 comedy films
1952 films
Czechoslovak comedy films
Czechoslovak black-and-white films
Films based on fairy tales
1950s Czech-language films
1950s Czech films